Showdown is a Canadian television game show, which aired on CTV in the network's inaugural 1961–62 season.

Hosted by Hamilton radio broadcaster Paul Hanover, the program featured contestants competing to answer general knowledge questions on music. Showdown was produced for CTV by Screen Gems (now Sony Pictures Television) and CFCF-TV (one of several co-productions between the network and Screen Gems) and was broadcast each Thursday at 7:30 PM beginning 5 October 1961.

References

External links
 Showdown at the Canadian Communications Foundation
 Showdown at TVarchive.ca

1960s Canadian game shows
CTV Television Network original programming
1961 Canadian television series debuts
1962 Canadian television series endings
Television shows filmed in Montreal
Television series by Sony Pictures Television
Television series by Screen Gems